Sorkheh District was a district (bakhsh) in Semnan County, Semnan Province, Iran. At the 2006 census, its population was 14,194, in 4,195 families.  The District had one city: Sorkheh. The District had two rural districts (dehestan): Hafdar Rural District and Lasgerd Rural District. The District was replaced by Sorkheh County in 2012.

References 

Former districts of Iran
Former districts of Semnan Province
Semnan County
2012 disestablishments in Iran